Power Rangers Ninja Steel is the twenty-fourth season of the television program Power Rangers. The season was produced primarily using footage, costumes, and props from Japanese 39th Super Sentai series Shuriken Sentai Ninninger with minimal costume and prop elements being recycled from Ressha Sentai ToQger. The show was produced by Saban Brands and premiered on Nickelodeon on January 21, 2017. The third Power Rangers movie was released on the same year.

The second season of Ninja Steel and twenty-fifth Power Rangers season overall, Power Rangers Super Ninja Steel premiered on January 27, 2018. As the twenty-fifth anniversary season of the franchise, Super Ninja Steel featured popular Rangers from past seasons. Ninja Steel was the last installment in the series to have toys manufactured and distributed by Bandai and Super Ninja Steel was the last season produced by Saban Brands; the Power Rangers franchise was acquired by Hasbro in 2018.

The series features the last appearance of Jason David Frank as Tommy Oliver before his death in 2022.

Plot summary (Ninja Steel and Super Ninja Steel)

Season 1: Ninja Steel
Galvanax is the reigning champion of Galaxy Warriors, the most popular intergalactic TV game show in the universe where contestants from all over the universe battle to prove who is the galaxy's mightiest warrior. He has become determined to make himself invincible by controlling the mythical Ninja Nexus Prism, which contains the supernatural Ninja Nexus Star. Meanwhile, the Prism, flying through space, lands at the house of Master Dane Romero, who chips off old fragments of the Prism's metallic coating, creating the legendary Ninja Steel. When Galvanax came to Earth soon after, Master Dane Romero fought him to keep him from obtaining the Nexus Star and apparently sacrificed himself to thwart Galvanax's plan, while in the process separating the Nexus Star into six separate Ninja Power Stars, though Galvanax and his minions Madame Odius and Ripcon made off with his son Brody. Ten years later, an enslaved Brody escapes from Galvanax's ship with the Prism, the Power Stars, and fellow slaves Redbot and Mick Kanic and returns to Earth, descending into the city of Summer Cove where they meet high school students Preston Tien, Sarah Thompson, Calvin Maxwell and Hayley Foster who manage to retrieve the Power Stars from the Prism and morph into the Ninja Steel Power Rangers. Furious at the outcome, Galvanax sends his warrior contestants down to Earth to steal the Prism where each epic battle against the Rangers is broadcast throughout the universe. Together, the Rangers must master their arsenal of Power Stars, Mega Morph Cycles, and Zords, that are all made from the Ninja Steel, in order to stop this evil threat and save the Earth from destruction. During their battles, they gain a new addition to their team in the form of country singer Levi Weston, who received his own Power Star and became the Gold Ranger. He is later revealed to be Brody's long lost brother Aiden.

During the final battle against Galvanax, the Ninja Nexus Prism restores Brody's broken Red Ninja Power Star where it not only turns Mick into an alternate Red Ranger, but also restores Master Dane Romero. The Rangers are able to destroy Galvanax with the Ninja Nexus Prism going inactive, but Madame Odius survives the unexpected Ninja Steel meteor attack on Galvanax's ship.

Super Ninja Steel
In Power Rangers Super Ninja Steel, the heroic teens find themselves face-to-face with an old enemy when they discover that Madame Odius is still alive and is more determined than ever to steal the Ninja Nexus Prism and revive its powers for her nefarious purposes with the assistance of Badonna, Brax, and General Tynamon. Now it is up to the Rangers and some unexpected help from new friends to use the power of teamwork to protect the Prism, defeat Madame Odius, and save the world.

Sledge and his crew from Power Rangers Dino Charge escape from a wormhole (due to events from the Power Rangers Dino Super Charge finale – "End of Extinction", thought they did not fade away from existence by the history alteration except Fury and Curio after their past selves are destroyed, assumed there is a side effect from the wormhole that keep them from being erased.), thus arriving in the main dimension of the Power Rangers multiverse. After finding the wreckage of the Warrior Dome and the survivors of the asteroid collision (including Madame Odius and Cosmo Royale), Sledge offers to fix the ship in exchange for the asteroid, which is covered in Ninja Super Steel, a metal even stronger than Ninja Steel. Instead, Odius tricks him and gains the loyalty of a prisoner of his named Badonna, takes the Super Steel for herself, and gets the ship fixed regardless. Putting Galaxy Warriors back on the air, Odius, Badonna, and a new contestant named Smellephant attack Earth to revive the Ninja Nexus Prism and forge evil Ninja Stars from Super Steel. Thanks to prior warning from a returning Mick and using every trick up their sleeves, the former Rangers manage to claim the Super Steel and regain their powers, though much stronger than before.

With new and improved powers and gear, the Rangers protect the Ninja Power Stars from Odius and her Warrior contestants. In order to get an edge on them, Badonna books a ragtag team of Galactic Ninjas, intent on proving their superiority to the "Earth Ninjas". Odius hatches a plan to send the Galactic Ninjas into fatal battles in order to claim their Ninja Medallions for the creation of Foxatron, her own Zord. Foxatron destroys the Ninja Ultrazord, leaving the Rangers' Zord Stars burned and in no condition for use. Luckily, with the help of three mysterious cloaked figures, they are able to repair the Zord Stars and destroy Foxatron with their new Ninja Blaze Megazord, gained by proving to the Prism, that they're kind at heart enough to be worthy of such power.

As revenge, Odius forms an alliance with Lord Draven, ruler of an evil dimension known as the Antiverse. The two plan to unite all dimensions into one and use an army of Robo Ranger clones to conquer them all. Fortunately, the Ninja Steel Rangers and a team of Legendary Rangers (including the three cloaked figures revealed to be Wes Collins, Gemma from RPM, and Koda from Dino Charge, as well as Tommy Oliver, Katherine Hillard, Rocky DeSantos, Trent Fernandez-Mercer, T.J. Johnson, Antonio Garcia, and Gia Moran, all of whom escaped Draven's captivity) are able to destroy Draven and stop the merging of the dimensions.

After the fall of the Galactic Ninjas and Draven's demise, Odius continues to plot the Rangers' downfall, even as going as far as to trick the legendary Space Sheriff Skyfire into viewing the Rangers as thieves, while the sheriff was hunting a wanted criminal and demolitions expert named Blammo, who was a contestant on Galaxy Warriors at the time. Odius makes yet another deal, this time with General Tynamon, manager of a famous fighter named Brax. Tynamon is actually a small monster using a robot suit to look big, hoping Odius will grant him to grow big if he can get the Power Stars and destroy the Rangers. While he does succeed in testing out her mind control device and thus gaining Mick as an ally, the monster is only able to achieve his dream for a small amount of time, as he is destroyed by the Rangers. For Odius however, losing Tynamon is meaningless as Mick can help her launch her ultimate plan.

Mick promises to help her broadcast a signal which will mind control the whole planet. A monster named Gorrox disguises as a TV producer to get humans for her broadcast. The audition he holds causes Calvin and Hayley to argue and breakup, while, Victor and Monty are chosen for the role. Gorrox reveals himself and is destroyed along with a vengeful Brax, in battle with the Rangers. Unfortunately, they are unable to stop her as Odius now controls half the human race and has ambushed Summer Cove High. While Sarah and Hayley sneak onto the Warrior Dome to save a mind controlled Calvin, the Romero brothers and Preston watch as Odius turns the Nexus Prism evil and forges a Ninja Nexus Super Star, revealing she's wanted to control an army with the Prism's power for a thousand years. The three are then forced to fight Brody and Levi's father, whom was also mind controlled. Luckily, Hayley destroys the satellite and gets back together with a free Calvin. Odius' former human soldiers escape with Victor and Monty's help, leading to the destruction of the Warrior Dome and demise of Cosmo Royale and Badonna. Despite having her plan failed, Odius is still able to unite with the Nexus Super Star. The Rangers reunite and in order to combat a seemingly unstoppable Odius, infuse themselves with the power of the Nexus Star with a little help from Preston's magic. Try as she may, Odius is no match for a whole team of those with equal powers to hers, falling in the final battle when the Rangers combine their Nexus Stars combined with the Nexus Power and bringing peace to Earth. Victor and Monty are rewarded for their bravery in helping to stop Odius while the Rangers return their powers to the Ninja Nexus Prism, which uses its power to reforge its Ninja Steel crust and flies off in search of another planet in need. With Mick remaining on Earth as their teacher (though remaining in contact with his family through satellite), the Rangers return to life as normal high school students, unaware that Sledge and his crew are still alive elsewhere in space.

Later, Sledge and his crew return again on Christmas where the use the rebuilt Warrior Dome ship to start Poisandra's talk show. With help from Koda, the Blue Dino Charge Ranger and Santa Claus, Sledge and his crew along with his ship and reprogrammed Basher Bots are all destroyed this time for good. Afterwards, Koda invites the Ninja Steel Rangers back to his world to spend Christmas with him.

Cast and characters

Rangers
 William Shewfelt as Brody Romero, the Ninja Steel Red Ranger. He is Dane Romero's youngest son and Aiden's younger brother
 Peter Sudarso as Preston Tien, the Ninja Steel Blue Ranger
 Nico Greetham as Calvin Maxwell, the Ninja Steel Yellow Ranger
 Zoe Robins as Hayley Foster, the Ninja Steel White Ranger
 Chrysti Ane as Sarah Thompson, the Ninja Steel Pink Ranger
 Jordi Webber as Aiden Romero/Levi Weston, the Ninja Steel Gold Ranger. He is Dane Romero's oldest son and Brody's older brother.

Supporting cast
 Chris Reid as Victor Vincent
 Caleb Bendit as Monty
 Kelson Henderson as Mick Kanic, Ninja Steel Red Ranger II
 Ruby Love as Princess Viera
 Byron Coll as the voice of Redbot 
 Amanda Billing as Principal Hastings
 Claire Chitham as Mrs. Finch
 Mikaela Ruegg as Sandy
 Lori Dungey as Mrs. Bell
 Stanley Andrew Jackson III as Tom, Levi Weston's manager.
 Daniel Sing as the Mayor of Summer Cove
 Jodie Rimmer as Jackie Thompson
 Taylor Barrett as Ace
 Malcolm Bishop as Business manager to the Mayor of Summer Cove
 Mike Edward as Master Dane Romero, Ninja Steel Red Ranger III
 Taimana Marupo as Young Brody Romero
 Ethan Buckwell as Young Aiden Romero
 Kohji Mimura as Redbot (in-suit actor, Ninja Steel)
 Emma Carr as Redbot (in-suit actor, Super Ninja Steel)

Villains
 Richard Simpson as the voice of Galvanax
 Campbell Cooley as the voices of Ripcon and Cosmo Royale
 Jacque Drew as the voice of Madame Odius
 Marissa Stott as the voice of Badonna
 Jamie Linehan as the voice of Brax
 Rajneel Singh as the voice of Lord Draven
 Adam Gardiner as the voice of Sledge
 Estevez Gillespie as the voices of Wrench and General Tynamon
 Jackie Clarke as the voice of Poisandra

Guest stars
 Jason David Frank as Tommy Oliver, the original Green and White Ranger from Mighty Morphin Power Rangers, Zeo Ranger V Red from Power Rangers Zeo, the first Red Turbo Ranger from Power Rangers Turbo, and Black Dino Thunder Ranger from Power Rangers Dino Thunder.
 Steve Cardenas as Rocky DeSantos, the second Red Ranger from Mighty Morphin Power Rangers and Zeo Ranger III Blue Power Rangers Zeo.
 Catherine Sutherland as Katherine "Kat" Hillard, the second Pink Ranger from Mighty Morphin Power Rangers, Zeo Ranger I Pink Power Rangers Zeo & the first Pink Turbo Ranger from Power Rangers Turbo. (credited as Cat Chilson)
 Selwyn Ward as T.J. Johnson, the Blue Space Ranger from Power Rangers in Space and the second Red Turbo Ranger from Power Rangers Turbo.
 Jason Faunt as Wesley "Wes" Collins, the Red Time Force Ranger from Power Rangers Time Force.
 Jeffrey Parazzo as Trent Fernandez-Mercer, the White Dino Thunder Ranger from Power Rangers Dino Thunder.
 Li Ming Hu as Gemma, Ranger Operator Series Silver from Power Rangers RPM.
 Steven Skyler as Antonio Garcia, the Gold Samurai Ranger from Power Rangers Samurai.
 Ciara Hanna as Gia Moran, the Yellow Megaforce Ranger from Power Rangers Megaforce.
 Yoshi Sudarso as Koda, the Blue Dino Charge Ranger from Power Rangers Dino Charge.

Episodes

Power Rangers Ninja Steel (Season 24, 2017)

Power Rangers Super Ninja Steel (Season 25, 2018)

Comics
In 2018, the Ninja Steel Rangers appeared in Boom! Studios' "Shattered Grid", a crossover event between teams from all eras commemorating the 25th anniversary of the original television series. It was published in Mighty Morphin Power Rangers #25-30 and various tie-ins. A Power Rangers Ninja Steel story by Becca Barnes, Alwyn Dale and Simone Di Meo was published in Mighty Morphin Power Rangers 2018 Annual as part of the crossover.

A Power Rangers Ninja Steel story by Mat Groom, Michael Busuttil and Lucas Werneck was published the same year in Mighty Morphin Power Rangers 25th Anniversary Special #1.

References

External links

 Official Power Rangers Website
 

Ninja Steel
2017 American television series debuts
2018 American television series endings
2010s American high school television series
2010s American science fiction television series
2010s Nickelodeon original programming
Television series about size change
Television shows filmed in New Zealand
Television shows set in California
Ninja fiction
Martial arts television series
American children's action television series
American children's adventure television series
American children's fantasy television series
Television series created by Haim Saban